Adenylyl cyclase type 3 is an enzyme that in humans is encoded by the ADCY3 gene.

Function 

This gene encodes adenylyl cyclase 3, which is a membrane-associated enzyme and catalyzes the formation of the secondary messenger cyclic adenosine monophosphate (cAMP).

The ADCY3 subtype likely mediates odorant detection (possibly) via modulation of intracellular cAMP concentration.

References

External links

Further reading 

 
 
 
 
 
 
 
 
 
 
 
 
 
 
 
 
 

EC 4.6.1